The 2000 European Nations Cup (ENC) Second Division (a European rugby union competition for national teams) was contested over a one-year period by five teams during which all of them met each other once. The winner was Russia, who won all the games and was promoted to Division 1. There was no relegation to Division 3.

Table

Results

See also
 European Nations Cup First Division 2000
 European Nations Cup Third Division 2000
 European Nations Cup Fourth Division 2000

References

1999–2000
1999–2000 in European rugby union
1999–2000 in German rugby union
1999 in Russian rugby union
2000 in Russian rugby union
rugby union
rugby union
rugby union
rugby union
rugby union
rugby union
Germany at the European Nations Cup